Qezel or Qazal may refer to:
 Qazal, Kermanshah
 Qezel, North Khorasan